HM Prison Shotts is a prison near Shotts, North Lanarkshire, Scotland. It is a prison holding male prisoners with maximum security classification. Shotts exclusively holds prisoners serving a term of 5 years or longer, with some prisoners being transferred from other prisons due to a need for a more secure environment. The original prison was opened in 1978 with a design capacity of 528 inmates; the prison was completely rebuilt and new facilities opened in 2012, with a capacity of 538 adult male prisoners.

National facilities 
Shotts is the location for two national facilities, which provide specialist environments for a range of offenders around Scotland, including those outside the standard "catchment area" for the prison.

National Induction Centre 

The National Integration Centre (NIC) is a national facility providing for prisoners at the start of sentences of at least 8 to 10 years. The function of the centre is to provide an environment which can prepare the inmates for eventual moves to mainstream prisons. The NIC excludes prisoners serving sentences for sex offences. The centre was created to provide for prisoners in the first 3 to 6 months of their sentence, but some stay for up to 2 years with the average stay being approximately 1 year. In February 2007 the centre held 116 inmates.

Kerr House 

Kerr House is a 'top-end facility' located at HMP Shotts. It became the national top-end facility for Scotland in March 2007. It provides accommodation for low-supervision prisoners nearing the end of medium to long sentences (at least 4 year), most of whom have progressed from the mainstream facility at Shotts. The facility provides room for up to 59 inmates and in February 2007 held 46.

Accommodation 

HMP Shotts contains 6 accommodation units, including a Segregation Unit and the two National Facilities. 'B' and 'C' halls are the mainstream halls holding prisoners from the National Induction Centre or other nearby prisons. 'D' hall is a non-sex offender protection unit which houses inmates who have asked to be removed from mainstream circulation for their own protection. The NIC, 'B', 'C' and 'D' halls are almost identical in design, providing accommodation for approximately 120 prisoners. The Segregation Unit houses up to 12 inmates, from Shotts and other prisons around Scotland, who have been removed from general prison populations.

When inspected by HM Inspectorate of Prisons in February 2007, Shotts held a total of 512 prisoners. During an inspection in February 2007, the units held the following number of prisoners:

Shotts prison was completely rebuilt in 2012, with a capacity of 553 adult male prisoners.

References

External links 
 Scottish Prison Service: HMP Shotts
 2007 HMIP Inspection Report

Shotts
Buildings and structures in North Lanarkshire
Government agencies established in 1978
1978 establishments in Scotland
Shotts